El Fenómeno is the first compilation album by singer-songwriter Arcángel, released on December 9, 2008, by Machete Music.

Album details
El Fenómeno is the first commercially released album by Arcángel, due to the unsuccessful attempt to release his previous album, La Maravilla. Originally intended to be released on November 25, 2008, it was suddenly pushed back to December 9, 2008. Guests featured on the album are J-King, Don Omar and Tempo. The album contains six tracks from his previous unreleased album La Maravilla, and also includes his first commercially successful single "Chica Virtual", previously released on the DJ Nelson compilation album Flow La Discoteka 2. The lead single from the album, "Por Amar a Ciegas", was released on December 3, 2008.

Track listing

Chart performance

References

2008 debut albums
Arcángel (singer) albums
Machete Music albums
Albums produced by Luny Tunes
Albums produced by Noriega
Albums produced by Nely